Gift Ele Otuwe (born 15 July 1984) is a Nigerian football midfielder. She plays for Bobruichanka in the Belarusian Premier League. She has been a member of the Nigerian national team, taking part in the 2004 Summer Olympics and the 2007 World Cup.

She played for FC Minsk in Belarus capping 97 times and scoring 34 goals before she moved to Turkey in March 2017.

References

Living people
1984 births
Nigerian women's footballers
FC Minsk (women) players
Expatriate women's footballers in Belarus
2007 FIFA Women's World Cup players
1207 Antalya Spor players
Nigerian expatriate sportspeople in Turkey
Expatriate women's footballers in Turkey
Footballers at the 2004 Summer Olympics
Nigeria women's international footballers
Women's association football midfielders
Women's association football forwards
Bayelsa Queens F.C. players
Olympic footballers of Nigeria